A Dangerous Profession is a 1949 American film noir directed by Ted Tetzlaff, written by Warren Duff and Martin Rackin, and starring George Raft, Ella Raines, and Pat O'Brien. The supporting cast features Jim Backus.

It was one of a series of thrillers Raft made in the late 1940s, with decreasing commercial results.

Plot
The story begins as Police Lt. Nick Ferrone (Jim Backus) explains what bail bondsmen do and tells the viewers the setting is Los Angeles. One such man is Vince Kane (George Raft), a former police detective who worked with Ferrone. When one of his customers, Claude Brackett (Bill Williams), is murdered, Kane decides to investigate. He has two reasons for investigating: the curiosity of a former cop and it seems that he has fallen in love with Brackett's widow Lucy, an old flame.

Cast
 George Raft as Vince Kane
 Ella Raines as Lucy Brackett
 Pat O'Brien as Joe Farley
 Bill Williams as Claude Brackett
 Jim Backus as Police Lt. Nick Ferrone
 Roland Winters as Jerry McKay
 Betty Underwood as Elaine Storm
 Robert Gist as Roy Collins, aka Max Gibney
 David Bauer as Matthew Dawson (as David Wolfe)

Production
It was the fourth movie George Raft made for RKO following World War II, following Johnny Angel, (aka The Big Jump, and Hounded); Nocturne; and Race Street.

The film was an original script by Warren Duff and Martin Rackin called The Bail Bond Story. It was originally sought by Humphrey Bogart's company. Later Fred MacMurray optioned it for his company but he allowed the option to expire.

Eventually the script was bought by RKO who got George Raft to star. Raft was meant to star in The Big Steal but had been held up making Hounded, (aka The Big Jump, but released as Johnny Angel, and so was replaced by Robert Mitchum; RKO gave him this film instead. Pat O'Brien signed to co star and filming was pushed back to enable O'Brien to appear in a stage production of What Price Glory? directed by John Ford and so that Raft could go to Europe.

In February 1949 Howard Hughes announced that Lewis Milestone would direct and Raft would star alongside O'Brien and Jane Russell. However, in the end Ted Tetzlaff directed.

Filming started in May 1949. Jean Wallace played the female lead but was fired after four days.
She was replaced by Ella Raines, who was flown out from England.

The film's title was changed to A Dangerous Profession in September.

Reception
Pat O'Brien later called the film "a dog".

Box Office
Raft's three previous films for RKO were profitable but this film recorded a loss of $280,000.

Critical
The New York Times gave the film a mixed review, and wrote, "Laconic and familiarly tough are the words for Raft's performance as the torch-bearing bail bonds-man. Ella Raines is decorative if little else as the object of his affections; Pat O'Brien contributes a standard portrayal as his hard business partner; James Backus is professional as a tenacious detective lieutenant and Bill Williams is adequate in the brief role of the embezzler. A Dangerous Profession, in short, proves that the bail-bond business can be dangerous and that it also can be the basis for an exceedingly ordinary adventure."

References

External links
 
 
 
 
A Dangerous Profession at BFI

1949 films
1949 crime films
American mystery films
American black-and-white films
Film noir
RKO Pictures films
Films directed by Ted Tetzlaff
Films scored by Friedrich Hollaender
1949 mystery films
American crime films
1940s English-language films
1940s American films